Cro-Mag Rally is a kart racing game developed by Pangea Software and published by Aspyr, which takes place in caveman times. It was originally released for Mac OS 9 and Mac OS X, and was later ported to iOS, Xbox 360, Android, and Windows Phone 7.

Gameplay
Inspired by Mario Kart, the game centers around two caveman racers, Brog and Grag in vehicles made out of materials associated with cavemen, as they race through stages of ancient history. The goal is to guide the caveman through different sets of tracks that include hazards, such as pits or tornado. Each course is unlocked from the start, and are made of 3 laps each with several difficulty options. During the race, the players can pick up power ups (including bombs, nitro, tire traction, and oil slicks) that can be used against the opponents. Every one of them will last 15 seconds. At the beginning, only a few vehicles are available. They all behave diversely, making a distinction in control, speed, suspension and traction attributes. However, as the progress is made, all eleven vehicles can be unlocked.  

The iOS version uses the accelerometer for steering left and right, with specific touch-screen buttons for driving forwards/backwards and weapons. A variety of options can be adjusted separately, like steering sensitivity. It has two game modes: Race, with a focus on beating the others to the finish line, and Gather, which relies on picking up arrowheads on the track as fast as possible.

In the Mac version, the single player part consists of a Practice Mode, where the players can test the cars and tracks, and a Tournament Mode with nine stages divided between three periods: the Bronze Age, the Stone Age, and the Iron Age. To make a progress, the player has to finish the race in third position or higher, while collecting eight arrowheads across the level at the same time. There is a Physics Editor, which allows the player to alter elements of play such as speed, acceleration, suspension, and traction of each car, as well as gravity.  

Cro-Mag Rally has multiple multiplayer variants. On the Mac version, the game allows up to six players to compete via local area network. A number of modes are available, such as Race, Tag, Survive, and Quest For Fire. Race is the usual mode with the players having a battle for the first place. There are two versions of Tag, both being each other's opposites: Keep-Away and Stampede. Keep-Away begins with one player being "it", with the goal of being the last man standing by avoiding the elimination by staying the "it" for a long time.  and ends when all but one of the players has been eliminated from the game by being "it" far too long. Meanwhile, in Stampede, the winner is the one to stay as the  "it" for two minutes. Survive allows the players to slam karts and fire weapons at the opponents, until only one vehicle is left. Similar to Capture The Flag, Quest For Fire splits the players into two teams, trying to seize five torches from the enemies and move them to their base. The iOS version offered a four-player online multiplayer via Game Center.

Reception

References

External links
 Official website

2000 video games
Android (operating system) games
Racing video games
IOS games
Classic Mac OS games
Prehistoric people in popular culture
Windows Phone games
Video games set in prehistory
Xbox 360 games
Aspyr games
Multiplayer and single-player video games
Pangea Software